Kim Min-suk (also Kim Min-seok, ; born February 3, 1979) is a retired South Korean swimmer, who specialized in sprint freestyle and backstroke events. He is a two-time Olympian (1996 and 2000), and a double medalist at the 2002 Asian Games in Busan.

Kim made his official debut, as a 17-year-old, at the 1996 Summer Olympics in Atlanta. He failed to reach the top 16 final in the 100 m backstroke, finishing in thirty-ninth place with a time of 58.43. He also placed fifteenth as a member of the South Korean team in the 4×200 m freestyle relay (7:45.98), and seventeenth in the 4×100 m medley relay (3:50.84).

At the 2000 Summer Olympics in Sydney, Kim decided to experiment with the sprint freestyle, competing only in two swimming events. He posted FINA B-standards of 22.99 (50 m freestyle) and 51.14 (100 m freestyle) from the Dong-A Swimming Tournament in Ulsan. In the 100 m freestyle, Kim placed twenty-fourth on the morning's prelims. Swimming in heat six, he picked up a second spot by 0.21 of a second behind winner Peter Mankoč of Slovenia in a lifetime best of 50.49. Two days later, in the 50 m freestyle, Kim missed the semifinals by a small fraction of 0.02 seconds, finishing a tie with China's Jiang Chengji in a South Korean record of 22.82.

When his nation hosted the 2002 Asian Games in Busan, Kim won a total of two medals, one gold and one bronze. In the 50 m freestyle, Kim was delighted and overwhelmed by the home crowd, as he shared a gold medal with Uzbekistan's Ravil Nachaev in a matching time of 22.86, just 0.04 seconds outside his record from Sydney two years before. He also captured a bronze, along with his teammates Sung Min, Han Kyu-Chul, and Ko Yun-Ho, in the 4×100 m freestyle relay (3:23.58).

References

1979 births
Living people
South Korean male backstroke swimmers
Olympic swimmers of South Korea
Swimmers at the 1996 Summer Olympics
Swimmers at the 2000 Summer Olympics
Swimmers at the 1998 Asian Games
Swimmers at the 2002 Asian Games
Swimmers at the 2006 Asian Games
Asian Games medalists in swimming
South Korean male freestyle swimmers
Swimmers from Seoul
Asian Games gold medalists for South Korea
Asian Games bronze medalists for South Korea
Medalists at the 2002 Asian Games
21st-century South Korean people